Wrestling was contested by men and women at the 2010 Asian Games in Guangzhou, China. Only men competed in Greco-Roman wrestling while both men and women contested for medals in freestyle wrestling. All competition were held from November 21 to 26 at Huagong Gymnasium.

Schedule

Medalists

Men's freestyle

Men's Greco-Roman

Women's freestyle

Medal table

Participating nations
A total of 233 athletes from 28 nations competed in wrestling at the 2010 Asian Games:

References

Men's Greco-Roman Results
Men's Freestyle Results
Women's Freestyle Results

External links
Wrestling Site of 2010 Asian Games
2010 Asian Games at fila-wrestling.com

 
2010
Asian Games
2010 Asian Games events